Peri is a given name and surname in various cultures.

People with the surname

 Achille Peri (1812–1880), Italian composer and conductor
 Claude Péri (born 1972), French figure skating coach and former competitor
 Cristina Peri Rossi (born 1941), Uruguayan novelist, poet, and author of short stories
 Enzo Martins Peri, Brazilian Army commander
 Gabriel Péri (1902—1941), French communist journalist and politician, member of the French Resistance
 Jacopo Peri (1561–1633), Italian composer and singer
 Michael Peri (born 1967), US Army soldier convicted of espionage
 Peter Laszlo Peri (1899–1967), Hungarian artist, sculptor and architect
 Peter Peri (born 1971), artist, grandson of Peter Laszlo Péri
 Yaakov Peri (born 1944), head of the Israeli domestic intelligence agency and CEO of Cellcom Israel

People with the given name

 Peri Baumeister,
 Peri Bearman,
 Peri Drysdale (born 1954), New Zealand businesswoman
 Peri Gilpin (born 1961), American actress
 Peri Horne,
 Peri Marošević,
 Peri Neufeld,
 Peri Suzan Özkum,
 Peri Vaevae Pare,
 Peri Pourier,
 Peri Sandria,
 Peri Schwartz,
 Peri Sundaram,
 Peri Tarr, American computer scientist

Fictional characters
 Peri Brown in the British science fiction series Doctor Who
 Peri Lomax in the British soap opera Hollyoaks
 Peri Westmore in Devious Maids
 Peri, a girl from Julie's Greenroom
 Peri, an orange mutant from TV series, Spliced (TV series).

See also
 Gastone Brilli-Peri (1893–1930), Italian racing driver
 John Perie VC (1831–1874), Scottish soldier
 Parry (disambiguation)
 Peri (disambiguation)
 Perri (disambiguation)
 Perry (disambiguation)
 Porri (disambiguation)

Hebrew-language surnames
Italian-language surnames